James Worth Thornton (September 19, 1906 – February 6, 1983, Virginia) was an American businessman and scion of the politically and socially connected Thorntons of Indiana.  Thornton was the son of Sir Henry Worth Thornton and Virginia Blair, daughter of banker and steel magnate George Dike Blair. Thornton also appeared in the journals of noted essayist Edmund Wilson.

Thornton was born into a prominent family in the railroad business and enjoyed a privileged childhood.  After graduating from the Royal Military College of Canada, Ontario, while working in Europe, Thornton earned a reputation as an international playboy:  he was reportedly an excellent polo player and prominent in social circles.  While working for a firm in Frankfurt, Germany, in 1931 Thornton married Helene-Marthe (Elena ) Mumm von Schwarzenstein, a German-Russian-French aristocrat and partial heir to the Mumm champagne fortune.  Her maternal relations (the Struve family) were prominent Russian diplomats and astronomers.  After marriage, Thornton served as Vice-President of the Mumm family’s American Incorporation.  Thornton and Elena had one son:  Henry Hermann Mumm Thornton, born 1932.

1932–1946 
Shortly after marriage, James and Elena Mumm Thornton moved to Montreal and, then, to New York City, where Elena served as an assistant editor for Town & Country (magazine).  While working as an editor, Elena met Edmund Wilson, the prominent author and critic, and fell in love.  In 1946, Elena and Edmund fled to Reno, Nevada, divorced their respective spouses, and married, creating a minor media sensation.  Elena Mumm Thornton was Edmund Wilson’s fourth wife.

1950–1983 
James W. Thornton joined the Central Intelligence Agency in 1950, retiring in 1958 upon marrying Martha Florence Armstrong, granddaughter of the 1st Baronet Armstrong.  Until his death on February 6, 1983, Thornton moved frequently, living in New York City, Spain, Bermuda, Florida, and northern Virginia. Thornton's grandchildren include Dr. Sandra Christine Thornton-Whitehouse, wife of Sheldon Whitehouse, Senator from Rhode Island; Elena Thornton Kissel, wife of musician and producer, Michael Case Kissel, 3rd great grandson of Cornelius Vanderbilt; Nina Rosalie McMann; and James Speno Mumm Thornton.  His great-grandchildren include Mary Whitehouse, Alexander Whitehouse, Siena Kissel, Lucy Kissel, Rosalie Kissel, Keely Russell-Thornton, and Henry Russell-Thornton.  He was a second cousin of silver screen actress Edna Goodrich and Elcar Interim President Arthur Martin Graffis.  His cousin, Helen Thornton Geer, was a prominent librarian and researcher.

Through his maternal line, he was related to the powerful Cox family:  billionaire heiresses Anne Cox Chambers and Barbara Cox Anthony were his second cousins.

Notes 

1906 births
1983 deaths
American socialites
Royal Military College of Canada alumni
Cox family